The Fénelon River is a  long river that runs through the community of Fenelon Falls, City of Kawartha Lakes in the Kawartha Lakes district of Ontario, Canada. It connects Cameron Lake to Sturgeon Lake.

See also  
List of rivers of Ontario

References
Atlas of Canada topographic maps 31D10 retrieved 2007-11-08

Rivers of Kawartha Lakes